Società Sportiva Milazzo is an Italian association football club, based in Milazzo, Sicily.

History 
The club was founded in 1937 and refounded in 2006 and 2014.

From Promozione to Lega Pro Seconda Divisione 
After a long period in the lower divisions of Italian football, Milazzo, thanks to three consecutive promotions, has succeeded in joining the professional football by taking part in Lega Pro Seconda Divisione in the 2009–10 season after an ascent started in Promozione Sicily in the 2007–08 season.

Its first season in the Lega Pro Seconda Divisione in 2010–2011 was successful, thanks to a great performance in the second round, which led the team finishing 3rd in the standings. Milazzo played in the playoffs against Avellino, but lost both matches, thus remained in the Lega Pro Seconda Divisione for next season. In this year's began a collaboration with the Liverpool FC: in fact most of the players coming through the youth team of Liverpool.

In the second season in Lega Pro Seconda Divisione Milazzo was facing relegation many times, but in the end was saved. In 2013 it was excluded from all competitions but in 2014 it was admitted to Eccellenza Sicily.

Colors and badge 
The team's colors are red and blue.

External links 
Web fans

Football clubs in Italy
Football clubs in Sicily
Milazzo
Association football clubs established in 1937
Serie C clubs
1937 establishments in Italy